Heteroponera dolo is a species of ant in the genus Heteroponera, endemic to Argentina, Brazil, Paraguay and Uruguay. It was described by Roger in 1860.

References

Heteroponerinae
Hymenoptera of South America
Insects described in 1860